Mitternacht - The Dark Night of the Soul is the 12th album by Sopor Aeternus & the Ensemble of Shadows. The album was released in September 2014 in two different formats: in compact disc format with 36-page hardcover book, and an exclusive T-shirt (limited to 1999 copies); and on 12" vinyl with a 28-page booklet in 12" format and two posters (limited to 890 copies). Both editions are signed and numbered by Anna-Varney Cantodea herself and feature illustrations by Anastasiya Chyringa, a fan whose artwork Anna-Varney encountered on Tumblr.

The song "La prima vez" is a cover of a traditional Sephardic song.

Track listing

Personnel 
Sopor Aeternus & The Ensemble of Shadows
Anna-Varney Cantodea - vocals, all other instruments, programming, mixing

Additional Musicians
Nikos Mavridis – violin 
Tim Ströble - cello
Sebastian Jülich: bassoon
Isabel Funke - clarinet
Viola Schwartzkopff - oboe
Jonas Schira - cornet
Michael Fütterer - trombone
Patrick Chirilus-Bruckner - tuba
Patrick Damiani - bass, lute, recording, mixing
Marcel Millot - drums
Robin Schmidt - mastering

References 

2014 albums
Sopor Aeternus and The Ensemble of Shadows albums